The York Dispatch Newspaper Offices is a historic commercial building located at York, Pennsylvania, York County, Pennsylvania.  It was built in 1887, and is a four-story, four bay brick building in the Italianate Revival style used as the offices of The York Dispatch. The building consists of two independent sections connected by an overhead walkway. The front facade is built of cast iron and pressed metal and features decorative pilasters and long, slender windows.

It was added to the National Register of Historic Places in 1978.

See also
National Register of Historic Places listings in York County, Pennsylvania

References

Newspaper headquarters in the United States
Newspaper buildings
Cast-iron architecture in the United States
Commercial buildings on the National Register of Historic Places in Pennsylvania
Italianate architecture in Pennsylvania
Commercial buildings completed in 1887
Buildings and structures in York, Pennsylvania
National Register of Historic Places in York County, Pennsylvania